"The Death of God" is the second and most recent CD single by Roy Harper, released on April 2005.

History
Of the 2003 Iraq War, Harper stated "Our famous leader took us into an illegal war and killed thousands of children. Was that cool? Or was it all just a myth?..." 

The 13 minute single was "...conceived out of (the) disgust I feel whenever war is used as some kind of solution..." (see cover notes). the lyrics contain various stories rolled into one, those of "The emigrant, the soldier, the bomber, the leader, and "God!".

Harper dedicated the single to the memory of Ali Hader VC, of the 6th/13th Frontier Force Rifles, Indian Army (Pakistan). "...who helped to get me out of a bit of a jam with Adolf in '45...".

A video of the song was released in 2005 on Harper's DVD album, Beyond the Door.

Track listing 
"The Death of God" (Long Version) – 13:18
"The Death of God" (Short Version) – 2:58

Personnel 
Roy Harper – vocals and guitar
Matt Churchill – guitar
John Fitzgerald – keyboard
Laurie
Duncan
George Fort – cover design
Brad and Monica – cover design

References

External links 
http://www.royharper.com/ – Roy Harper Official Site
http://www.iki.fi/musicnaut/royharper.html – Excellent Roy Harper resource
http://www.giantsquideye.com/ – Album artists website

Roy Harper (singer) songs
2005 singles
2005 songs